Camotán is a municipality in the Chiquimula department of Guatemala.

History

2001 famine

On 3 August 2001, Camotán municipality declared yellow code in the area when it learned about the desperate situation that the rural communities were facing, facing imminent famine; the root cause of the crisis were the short raining season, and the decline in the international coffee price. Alfonso Portillo's government decreed State of Calamity to get international help; officially, 48 deceased were reported, but there were rumors of hundreds of casualties.

In March 2022, the Catholic church in the town of Camotan burnt down because of a lightning stroke the church after a severe rainstorm, and the town mayor asked for national refund help to rebuild the church, there is no further notice about the plan.

Population 

Total population as of 2002 was 35,263, living in 6,479 homes.

Climate 

Camotán has a tropical savanna climate (Köppen: Aw).

Geographic location

See also
 
 
 List of places in Guatemala

Notes and references

References

Municipalities of the Chiquimula Department